Matthias Jean Phaëton (born 8 January 2000) is a professional footballer who plays as a forward for Grenoble. Born in France, he represents the Guadeloupe national team.

Professional career
A youth product of Stade Brestois 29, Phaëton left for disciplinary reasons and joined Guingamp in January 2017. He made his professional debut with Guingamp in a 5–0 Ligue 1 loss to Nantes on 4 November 2018.

On 29 June 2022 Phaëton signed a three-year deal with Grenoble.

International career
Born in France, Phaëton is of Guadeloupean descent. Phaeton is a youth international for France, and represented them at the 2016 Toulon Tournament scoring four goals in five games. He debuted for the Guadeloupe national team in a 2–0 2021 CONCACAF Gold Cup qualification win over Bahamas on 3 July 2021, where he scored his side's first goal.

References

External links
 
 
 
 
 EA Guingamp Profile

2000 births
Living people
Sportspeople from Colombes
Footballers from Hauts-de-Seine
Guadeloupean footballers
Guadeloupe international footballers
French footballers
France youth international footballers
French people of Guadeloupean descent
Association football forwards
En Avant Guingamp players
FC Bastia-Borgo players
Grenoble Foot 38 players
Ligue 1 players
Ligue 2 players
Championnat National players
Championnat National 2 players
Championnat National 3 players
2021 CONCACAF Gold Cup players